Skull Island is an island in the Northern Territory of Australia.  It is a part of the Sir Edward Pellew Group of islands which lie in the bay into which the McArthur River flows,  King Ash Bay, within the Gulf of Carpentaria. It is known for good catches of tiger prawns.

References

Islands of the Northern Territory